The Taipower Exhibit Center in Southern Taiwan is a science center about Taiwan electricity sector in Hengchun Township, Pingtung County, Taiwan. The center is owned by Taiwan Power Company.

History
The center was opened on 31 August 2005.

Architecture
The center features exhibition hall, movie theater and an outdoor solar panel.

Exhibitions
The center exhibits various information regarding electricity sectors in Taiwan, ranging from electric power overview, electricity generation, nuclear power, radioactive waste etc.

See also
 List of tourist attractions in Taiwan

References

External links
  

2005 establishments in Taiwan
Buildings and structures completed in 2005
Buildings and structures in Pingtung County
Science centers in Taiwan
Taiwan Power Company
Tourist attractions in Pingtung County